Geert Blanchart (born 30 October 1966) is a Belgian short track speed skater. He competed at the 1992 Winter Olympics and the 1994 Winter Olympics.

External links
 
 
Geert Blanchart at ISU

Geert Blanchart at the-sports.org

References

1966 births
Living people
Belgian male short track speed skaters
Olympic short track speed skaters of Belgium
Short track speed skaters at the 1992 Winter Olympics
Short track speed skaters at the 1994 Winter Olympics
Sportspeople from Leuven
20th-century Belgian people